The Laser 2, or Laser II, is a sailboat that was designed by New Zealander Frank Bethwaite and Canadian Ian Bruce as a one-design racer and first built in 1978.

Production
The design was built by Bruce's company, Performance Sailcraft, in Canada and also by Vanguard Sailboats in the United States. Production ran from 1978 until 1987, with 8,200 boats completed, but it is now out of production. In 2007 Performance Sailcraft and Vanguard were merged to form LaserPerformance.

Design

The Laser 2 is a sailing dinghy, built predominantly of fibreglass. It has a fractional sloop rig, a raked stem, a plumb transom, a transom-hung rudder controlled by a tiller with an extension and a retractable daggerboard. It displaces . The crew can make use of a single trapeze.

For sailing downwind the design may be equipped with a symmetrical spinnaker.

The design has a US Portsmouth Yardstick D-PN handicap of 92.8 and a UK RYA-PN of 1035.

Variants
The basic Laser 2 was produced in a number of variants, including the Laser II Fun, Laser II Regatta and the Laser Fun New Wave, which was equipped with an asymmetrical spinnaker. All were out of production by 1990.

Operational history
The boat was at one time a World Sailing international class, but its status has been revoked.

In a February 1980 review John Turnbull in Canadian Yachting wrote of the Laser 2, "Frank Bethwaite, the unclaimed maestro of high-powered dinghy design, and Ian Bruce, the designer / promoter of Performance Sailcraft, may have come up with the only boat that could live up to the expectations created by the Laser. It doesn't bring anything startlingly new to sailboat design except perhaps the idea that a mass-market boat should be fast and challenging."

Events

See also
List of sailing boat types

Related development
Laser (dinghy)

References

External links

Laser 2